The Jabal al-Zawiya massacres took place on 19–20 December 2011, in the Idlib province of Syria during the 2011-2012 Idlib Governorate clashes between the Syrian Army and opposition forces, within the larger scope of the 2011-2012 Syrian uprising. Human rights and opposition activists said that some 200 people were killed by Syrian security forces in the hills and villages of the north-western province of Idlib on 19 and 20 December 2011. The Syrian state news agency claimed that 1 terrorist was killed and several more wounded.

The event occurred following a large scale defection of hundreds of Syrian soldiers on 19 December, while some 70 of them were gunned down by loyalists. On 20 December, government forces backed by tanks reportedly launched an operation to hunt down the defectors who managed to escape.

Events

On 19 December, the FSA suffered its largest loss of life when new defectors tried to abandon their positions and bases between the villages of Kansafra and Kafr Oweid in Idlib province. Opposition activist groups, specifically the Syrian Observatory for Human rights, reported that 72 defectors were killed as they were gunned down during their attempted escape. The Syrian Army lost three soldiers during the clashes. The next day, SOHR stated that in all 100 defectors were killed or wounded. Also, the same day, the SOHR updated its number of civilians killed by government security forces in the province for the previous day from 37 to 111. It had been called a "massacre".

Alaa El Din Al Youssef, a Syrian opposition member in Idlib, described the government's attack on the area of Idlib and Jabal al-Zawiya as a massacre.

"Civilians were surrounded by security forces who killed 100 of us. The corpses of those killed were left in the streets and the mosques and we are not allowed to bury any of them."

"Some of those killed cannot be recognised. Some were burnt and some beheaded with their hands tied. We are really scared because the area might be stormed once again."

This claim cannot be independently confirmed.

The clashes continued into the next day, and another report, by Lebanese human rights activist Wissam Tarif, put the death toll even higher with 163 defectors, 97 government troops and nine civilians killed on the second day alone as the military tracked down the soldiers and civilians that managed to initially escape. On 21 December, it was reported that the FSA had taken control over large swathes of Idlib province including some towns and villages.

References

Massacres of the Syrian civil war perpetrated by the Syrian Army
Military operations of the Syrian civil war in 2011
Idlib Governorate in the Syrian civil war
Mass murder in 2011
Jabal Zawiya
Military operations of the Syrian civil war involving the Syrian government
Military operations of the Syrian civil war involving the Free Syrian Army
December 2011 events in Syria